The history of humor on the Internet begins together with the Internet itself. Initially, the internet and its precursors, LANs and WANs, were used merely as another medium to disseminate jokes and other kinds of humor, in addition to the traditional ones ("word of mouth", printed media, sound recording, radio, film, and TV). In lockstep with the progress of electronic communication technologies, jokers took advantage of the ARPANET, e-mail, Usenet newsgroups (e.g., rec.humor and alt.humor),  bulletin board systems, etc, and finally the Whole World Wide Web. Gradually, new forms of humor evolved, based on the new possibilities delivered by electronic means of communication. A popular form of internet humour is found in the form of 'internet memes'.

Impact on humor
Internet made an impact on humor in several important ways.

Similarly to other technical innovations (from printing to TV), Internet significantly increased the speed and the extent of the propagation of humor over the world. The joke is a commonly transmitted type of internet meme. It is well-known that orally-transmitted jokes and other kind of folklore undergo evolution and mutations. Internet speeds up and globalizes these processes.

A FAQ of rec.humor gave the following tongue-in-cheek description how jokes propagated in the era of newsgroups:
Somebody makes up the joke.
The joke spreads to about 50 people.
Somebody posts it to rec.humor.
Ten thousand people read the joke on rec.humor.
Eight hundred of these people repeat the joke to somebody.
Twenty of those people are clueless enough to repost the joke to rec.humor, apparently lacking either the reading skills to have seen it the first time, the basic pattern-recognition capability to identify it in its last ten repetitions, or the short-term memory to realize that it's the same joke again.
Loop back to step 4, about ten times.
Repeat from step 3 about every two months.

On the opposite side, unlike previous technical means, the Internet as a whole eliminates censorship and self-censorship of humor. For example, before the Internet, black comedy, such as dead baby jokes, was almost exclusively spread orally.

The Internet blurred the lines between written and spoken in terms of language use and the directness of speech, between what is permitted in private and in public. Also, YouTube blurred the distinction between a spoken and recorded joke, in that the narrator is actually present.

Limor and Lemish observe that internet humor is a part of the participatory culture, where the consumers of jokes may reciprocate by generating and transmitting humor, i.e., act as producers and distributors.

New types of humor
New possibilities provided by electronic means of communication gave rise to new types of humor. An early example of these is humorous ASCII art. While the precursor of the ASCII art, the "typewrite art", has been known since 19th century,   it was available to few. Whereas ASCII art, including silly one, has become ubiquitous in sig blocks in discussion boards and e-mails. One may find quite a few silly examples  in the Jargon File, which also mentions subgenres of ASCII art humor: puns on the letter/character names (e.g., if read "B" as "bee" and the caret character (^) as "carrot", the one may create an ASCII art rebus for a "bee in a carrot patch") and pictures of "silly cows" .

The ability to easily manipulate with images and videos combined with ease of the dissemination of them via the Internet introduced new forms of graphical humor, such as lolcats,  demotivators, and funny animations.

See also
Internet phenomenon
Faxlore

References

External links